Norbert Sturny (born 8 October 1963) is a Swiss sports shooter. He competed at the 1988 Summer Olympics and the 1992 Summer Olympics.

References

External links
 

1963 births
Living people
Swiss male sport shooters
Olympic shooters of Switzerland
Shooters at the 1988 Summer Olympics
Shooters at the 1992 Summer Olympics
Sportspeople from the canton of Fribourg